Conjugal Love was written in Italian (L'amore conjugale), by Alberto Moravia in 1947. It was translated into English by Angus Davidson in 1951 and by Marina Harss and published by Other Press in 2007.

The novel is written in the first person by a rich Italian dilettante who has gone with his wife to the countryside to attempt to write a novel. The situation is complicated, however, by the couple's decision to remain abstinent throughout this period, and the wife's accusation that her husband's barber has tried to molest her.

References

External links
 Other Press description of novel
 Washington Post review of novel
 LA Times review of novel
 The New Yorker review of novel
 Words without Borders review of novel

1947 novels
Novels by Alberto Moravia
Novels about writers